The Federal Centre for Health Education (BZgA) is a federal authority within the portfolio of the German Federal Ministry of Health. The Authority has its headquarters in Cologne and is headed by Heidrun Thaiss. The BZgA was founded in 1967.

Tasks 
The BZgA has the task of promoting the willingness of citizens to act responsibly to meet their health needs and to use the health care system properly. The main focuses of the BZgA are AIDS prevention, sex education, drug abuse prevention for both legal and illegal drugs, child and youth health, healthy eating and organ donation. In addition, the Federal Centre for Health Education performs studies and investigations in order to improve their educational work. The studies are published regularly. 

At its inception the BZgA had the following tasks:
 Development of guidelines and principles for the content and the methods of practical health education
 Education and training of people in the field of health education and information
 Coordination of health information and health education in the federal territory
 Cooperation with foreign countries in these fields

Government agencies established in 1967
Sex education
Organisations based in Cologne